Tava or Plita, is an island in the Bay of Baku, Azerbaijan.

Geography
It is a very small island, located between Boyuk Zira and Vulf (Dash Zira).
 
Caspian seals, sturgeon, and numerous types of birds like teal ducks, herring gulls, and grebes are a few of the species that can be found on and around the island.

References

External links
Yachting & Boating - Improtex

Islands of Azerbaijan
Islands of the Caspian Sea
Uninhabited islands of Azerbaijan